The 1982 Portland Timbers season was the eighth and final season for the Portland Timbers in the now-defunct North American Soccer League.

Squad  
The 1982 squad

North American Soccer League

Western Division standings 

Pld = Matches played; W = Matches won; L = Matches lost; GF = Goals for; GA = Goals against; GD = Goal difference; Pts = PointsSource:

Exhibition results

League results 

* = Shootout winSource:

References

1982
American soccer clubs 1982 season
1982 in sports in Oregon
Portland
1982 in Portland, Oregon